Pyropteron hispanicum is a moth of the family Sesiidae. It is found in southern France, Spain and Portugal (Algarve).

The larvae feed on the roots of Rumex scutatus and Rumex induratus.

References

Moths described in 1999
Sesiidae
Moths of Europe